The following list includes notable people who were born or have lived in Cranston, Rhode Island.

Arts and culture 

 JVKE, musician, singer-songwriter, producer, and social media personality born and raised in Cranston.
 Stevie Aiello, musician, touring with Thirty Seconds to Mars, born and raised in Cranston
 Sasha Cagen, writer, editor, and entrepreneur; creator of the Quirkyalone movement; native of Cranston
 Olivia Culpo, Miss Rhode Island USA 2012, Miss USA 2012, Miss Universe 2012; born in Cranston
 Joyce Jillson, syndicated newspaper columnist, best-selling author, actress, and astrologer; born in Cranston
 Steven Klein (artist), fashion photographer and music video director; born in Cranston
 George Masso, jazz trombonist, bandleader, vibraphonist and composer; born in Cranston
 Domenic Thomas Russillo, architect; lived and died in Cranston
 Mike Stud, rapper, former duke baseball player; retired after Tommy John surgery
 Frederick Lewis Weis, reverend and author; born in Cranston

TV and film 

 Robert Aldrich, film director, writer, and producer (The Flight of the Phoenix, The Dirty Dozen, The Longest Yard); born in Cranston
 Vin Di Bona, TV producer (MacGyver, Entertainment Tonight, America's Funniest Home Videos); native of Cranston
 Jessica Graf, 2017 Big Brother contestant and 2018 The Amazing Race contestant; born in Cranston
 Elisabeth Hasselbeck, co-host of The View and 2001 Survivor contestant; born in Cranston
 Sam Hyde, comedian, writer, performance artist and actor; lives in Cranston
 Logan Marshall-Green, actor (Dark Blue, The O.C., 24, Traveler); grew up in Cranston
 Aimee Sweet, glamor model and pornographic actress; born in Cranston
 Dennis Wholey, TV host and New York Times bestselling author; born in Cranston

Business 

 Benjamin Knight, textile manufacturer; co-founder of Fruit of the Loom; lived in Cranston 
 Robert Knight, textile manufacturer; co-founder of Fruit of the Loom; lived in Cranston
 Abraham Nathanson (1929–2010), graphic designer; developed the game Bananagrams; lived in Cranston

Law and crime 

 Jessica Ahlquist, plaintiff in a lawsuit to remove a religious prayer from Cranston High School West
 Haiganush R. Bedrosian, first woman Chief Justice of the Rhode Island Family Court; grew up in Cranston
 Edward William Day, U.S. federal judge for the District of Rhode Island; born in Cranston
 John Gordon, last person executed in Rhode Island (1845); posthumously pardoned in 2011; lived in Cranston
 Matthew Guglielmetti, mobster; lived in Cranston
 Nicholas O'Neill, youngest of the 100 victims of The Station nightclub fire; lived in Cranston
 Ojetta Rogeriee Thompson, U.S. appellate court judge and Rhode Island Superior Court justice; lived in Cranston

Military 

 Christopher Lippitt, brigadier general in the Continental Army; textile mill owner; lived in Cranston
 George J. Peters, U.S. Army soldier; Medal of Honor recipient in World War II; born in Cranston
 Elisha Hunt Rhodes, general in the Union Army; his war diary was quoted in The Civil War series on PBS

Politics 

 Buddy Cianci, 32nd and 34th Mayor of Providence, Rhode Island; born in Cranston
 Richard T. Cooney, New Hampshire state legislator
 Edward D. DiPrete, 70th Governor of Rhode Island; Mayor of Cranston (1978–1985)
 Elisha Harris, 20th Governor of Rhode Island; born in Cranston
 Henry Howard, 32nd Governor of Rhode Island; born in Cranston
 Nehemiah Knight, U.S. Congressman; born in Cranston
 Nehemiah R. Knight, U.S. Senator; 9th Governor of Rhode Island; born in Cranston
 Steve Laffey, Mayor of Cranston (2003–2007)
 Charlene Lima, Rhode Island state representative; lived in Cranston
 Henry Curtis Lind, 14th reporter of decisions of the US Supreme Court; born in Cranston
 Nicholas Mattiello, Rhode Island state representative; lived in Cranston
 David Moretti, actor (Dante's Cove, The Lair); born in Cranston
 Michael Napolitano, Mayor of Cranston (2007–2009)
 John O. Pastore, 61st Governor of Rhode Island and United States Senator; lived in Cranston
 Jack Reed, U.S. senator and Congressman representing Rhode Island's 2nd congressional district; born in Cranston
 Elizabeth H. Roberts, 68th Lieutenant Governor of Rhode Island; lives in Cranston
 William Sprague (1799–1856); U.S. Senator and industrialist; born in Cranston
 William Sprague (1830–1915); U.S. Senator and the 27th governor of Rhode Island; born in Cranston

Religion
 Jeffrey Mello, Episcopal priest (Bishop of Connecticut)

Science and academia

 Dorothy Bliss (1916–1987), crustacean researcher and curator at the American Museum of Natural History; born in Cranston

Sports

Baseball 

 Jimmy Cooney, shortstop in the 1890s for the Chicago Colts and Washington Senators; born in Cranston
 Jimmy Cooney, shortstop in the 1920s with six Major League Baseball teams; born in Cranston
 Johnny Cooney, outfielder for five Major League Baseball teams and manager for the Boston Braves; born in Cranston
 Hugh Duffy, outfielder for five Major League Baseball teams and manager with four teams; born in Cranston
 Tom Healey, pitcher for the Providence Grays and Indianapolis Blues; born in Cranston
 Thomas Pannone, current pitcher for the Toronto Blue Jays; born and raised in Cranston, Rhode Island
 Joe Trimble, pitcher for the Boston Red Sox and Pittsburgh Pirates

Boxing 

 Melissa Fiorentino, super featherweight female boxer; born in Cranston
 Vinny Paz, world champion lightweight and light middleweight boxer; born in Cranston

Football 

 Deon Anderson, fullback for the Dallas Cowboys and Miami Dolphins
 Will Blackmon, defensive back for the Green Bay Packers and New York Giants; Super Bowl champion (XLVI); born in Providence, grew up in Cranston 
 Amber van Eeghen, cheerleader for the New England Patriots; daughter of Mark van Eeghen; alum of Cranston High School West
 Mark van Eeghen, Pro Bowl running back for the Los Angeles Raiders and New England Patriots; all-state football player at Cranston High School West
 A.J. Smith, former executive for the Washington Redskins and San Diego Chargers; football coach at Cranston High School West

Hockey 

 Curt Bennett, former National Hockey League all star for the Atlanta Flames in 1975 and 1976; grew up in Cranston
 John Bennett, former World Hockey Association player for the Philadelphia Blazers
 Harvey Bennett, Jr., Curt's younger brother, center for five National Hockey League teams; born in Cranston
 Jack Capuano, defenseman for the Toronto Maple Leafs, Vancouver Canucks, and Boston Bruins; head coach of New York Islanders; born in Cranston
 Joe Cavanagh, lawyer and Hall of Fame forward on the 1972 US Olympic hockey team (broke his wrist in training); grew up in Cranston
 David Emma, right wing for the New Jersey Devils, Boston Bruins, and Florida Panthers; born in Cranston
 Joe Exter, goaltender for the (ECHL) Wheeling Nailers; born in Cranston
 Rob Gaudreau, right wing for the San Jose Sharks and Ottawa Senators; born in Cranston
 David Littman; goaltender for the Buffalo Sabres and Tampa Bay Lightning; born in Cranston
 Tom Mellor, defenseman for the Detroit Red Wings and silver medalist 1972 US Olympic hockey team; born in Cranston
 David Quinn, defenseman for the Binghamton Rangers (AHL), Cleveland Lumberjacks (IHL), and head coach of the Lake Erie Monsters (AHL), Current Head Coach of the New York Rangers, NHL ; born in Cranston
 Tim Regan, goaltender for the Hershey Bears and Cincinnati Swords of the AHL; lived in Cranston
 Ralph Warburton, right wing for the Worcester Warriors, Milwaukee Clarks, and Boston Olympics of the Eastern Hockey League; born in Cranston

Ice skating 

 Marissa Castelli, three time junior bronze medalist in novice pairs (U.S. twice, World once), two time national champion with Simon Shnapir in pairs (U.S.), bronze medalist in team figure skating at 2014 Olympics; lived in Cranston

Soccer 

 Sam Fletcher, full back and manager for several professional soccer teams; lived and died in Cranston
 Michael Parkhurst, defender for the New England Revolution and US men's national team; MLS Rookie of the year (2005)

Sports media 

 Steven Krasner, sportswriter for The Providence Journal; children's book author; grew up in Cranston

References

Cranston, Rhode Island
Cranston